This article lists the highest natural elevation of each sovereign state on the continent of Africa defined physiographically. 

Not all points in this list are mountains or hills, some are simply elevations that are not distinguishable as geographical features.

Notes are provided where territorial disputes or inconsistencies affect the listings. Egypt has part of their territory and their high point outside of Africa; their non-Asian high point are listed with a N/A rank entry underneath their continental peak. On the other hand, Spain has part of their territory and their high point inside of Africa.

One partially recognized country with the highest point in Africa is listed and ranked in Italic. For more details see List of states with limited recognition.

See also
Table of elevation extremes by country
List of highest points of Asian countries
List of highest points of European countries
List of highest points of Oceanian countries
List of islands by highest point
List of highest towns by country
List of highest mountains

References
 CIA World Factbook 2006 (items marked * have been amended, see  for supporting documentation). Both this list and the CIA list may contain further errors. Despite the claim by the CIA that their list was updated in July 2006, none of the errors listed on the talk page have been corrected.
 World Tops and Bottoms, by Grant Hutchison, 1996, TACit Press, and subsequent research by the same author, in collaboration with field research by Ginge Fullen. 
 Data supplied by the Shuttle Radar Topography Mission.
 Information about specific items on talk page

Geography of Africa
 Highest